The red-throated ant tanager (Habia fuscicauda) is a medium-sized passerine bird. This species is a resident breeder on the Caribbean slopes from southeastern Mexico to eastern Panama. It was usually considered an aberrant kind of tanager and placed in the Thraupidae, but is actually closer to the cardinals (Cardinalidae). Consequently, it can be argued that referring to the members of this genus as ant tanagers is misleading, but no other common name has gained usage.

Adult males are dull dusky red, somewhat paler below, and with a bright red throat and central crown. The female is brownish olive, paler and greyer below, and with a yellow throat and small dull yellow crown stripe. Young birds are brown and lack the throat and crown patches.

Both sexes of this species are duller and darker than the related red-crowned ant tanager which occurs on the Pacific slope in its Central American range.

The normal clutch is two or three white eggs laid from April to June.

These birds are found in pairs or small groups. They eat insects, arthropods and fruit like those of Cymbopetalum mayanum (Annonaceae), and less often Trophis racemosa (Moraceae), and will follow army ant columns especially in lowlands where antbirds are uncommon. The flock will give a defensive spread-wing-and-tail display to deter potential predators.

There are six known subspecies:
 H. f. salvini – (von Berlepsch, 1883): found from eastern Mexico to El Salvador
 H. f. insularis – (Salvin, 1888): found in the Yucatan Peninsula (southeastern Mexico) and northern Guatemala
 H. f. discolor – (Ridgway, 1901): found in northeastern, central and eastern Nicaragua
 H. f. fuscicauda – (Cabanis, 1861): nominate, found from southern Nicaragua to western Panama
 H. f. willisi – Parkes, 1969: found in central Panama
 H. f. erythrolaema – (Sclater, PL, 1862): found in northern Colombia

References

External links

 
 
 
 
 
 
 
 

red-throated ant tanager
Birds of Central America
Birds of the Yucatán Peninsula
Birds of Colombia
red-throated ant tanager